Number 96 is an Australian primetime soap opera that aired on 0-10 Network (the forerunner of what is now Network Ten) from 13 March 1972 to 11 August 1977, broadcast in the primetime slot of 8:30 pm every weeknight.

The premiere of the series was promoted heavily in media with newspaper advertisements that described it as "Tonight, Australian television loses its virginity" and it followed the lives of residents living in a four-story city apartment block at the fictional 96 Lindsay Street, Paddington.

The show was developed by production firm Cash Harmon Television, and created by novelist David Sale, whom also served as a screenwriter, the series was originally commissioned by the then flagging network to make a soap opera with similar elements to the British series "Coronation Street, but a little racier".

The show was a daring last-bid attempt from a network on the verge of bankruptcy, and its immediate success (and advertising revenue) helped it be more competitive and buy successful new international shows such as The Waltons and M*A*S*H. By 1974, on the back of the series, the network was number one in the ratings for the first time.

Television firsts

Number 96 became one of the most popular Australian drama television series of its era, not only was it the world's first daily primetime soap opera, it was the first to inspire a US remake. The program known for its humour as well as its groundbreaking depictions of taboo subjects of the time, exploring issues such as homosexuality, abortion, rape, interracial romance, drug usage, breast cancer Pregnancy in later life and transgenderism, but also its array of comedy characters with their own catchphrases, in a nod to vaudeville.

Television's first LGBT characters

The show was one of the first worldwide to include LGBT characters, most notably gay lawyer Don Finlayson played by Joe Hasham, who was a regular in the series and would have a series of boyfriends. Don was portrayed as dependable, heroic and kind instead of being limp-wristed or a victim.

Although Don is often stated as the first gay character on television, the first TV character was introduced in the US serie's sitcom All in the Family the previous year, as a friend of Archie Bunker's, known as "Steve" played by Phillip Carey stated to Archie, he was gay, although the character only appeared in the series briefly in an episode title "Judging Books by Covers".

According to the publication The Great Clowns of American Television, comedian Ernie Kovacs was the first person to portray a gay character on a long-term basis, as character Percy Dovetonsils, in his self-titled The Ernie Kovacs Show, although the term was not officially established at that time).

The first regular gay character in the United States debuted also in 1972 with actor Vincent Schiavelli as Peter Panama in sitcom The Corner Bar, but he did not make it to a second series, with then-president of the New York-based Gay Activists Alliance calling it "the worst stereotype of a gay person I’ve ever seen."

The series featured the world's first trans character on TV, as played by a transgender actress, with cabaret performer Carlotta featuring in the show as Robyn Ross, who had a doomed relationship with Arnold Feather Jeff Kevin.

The character of Marie Crowther, played by former TV chat host Hazel Phillips, was the show's second lesbian character, who was outed after she was caught perving on Vera Collins, played by Elaine Lee in the shower. Prior to Marie's arrival, a flatmate of Bev Houghton's, Karen Winter Toni Lamond, had lesbian tendencies and was shown fondling and kissing the virginal Bev while she slept under the effect of a sleeping pill. That character was later revealed to be a devil worshipper who wanted to sacrifice Bev to the Devil during a Black Mass, a storyline that was heavily censored and only screened uncut in Sydney, Newcastle and Wollongong before the censor demanded changes.

Bisexual photographer Bruce Taylor (Paul Weingott was Don's first lover and also having an affair with Maggie Cameron. Later, Don's most enduring relationship would be with Dudley Butterfield (Chard Hayward), who was hilariously camp, but also bisexual. Don and Dudley would live together for two years, but Dudley moved out to become a ladies man, which was mostly played for comedy.

The Box, which starred Judy Nunn as bisexual reporter Vicki Stafford, has the distinction of showing TV's first lesbian kissing scene with Felicity Helen Hemingway.

Broadcasting and production

In 1972, Australian television featured many imported shows, primarily from the United States and the United Kingdom. Previously, local soaps Autumn Affair, The Story Of Peter Grey, and Motel were only mildly successful. Long-running ABC soap Bellbird was moderately popular in rural areas, but less so in city locales.

Popular Crawford Productions shows Homicide, Division 4, and Matlock Police were all police procedurals, though, rather than conventional soap operas. 
 
Bill Harmon and Don Cash had previously worked in New York at NBC, and became a partnership after arriving in Australia and producing adventure series The Rovers and a couple of unsuccessful films.

Production of Number 96 started in October 1971. It was produced and filmed on [[vidoetape) in monochrome for the first three years, and switched to colour production in late 1974. Many of the early black-and-white episodes no longer exist, due primarily to network policy of the time of destroying or wiping tape.

Producer Don Cash, used one of the world's first computers to figure out how the series could construct such a large output, this standard was late rused on series created thereafter

The premise, original story outlines, and original characters were devised by series creator David Sale, who had also written for the TV comedy satire series The Mavis Bramston Show. Sale also wrote the scripts for the first episodes of Number 96 and continued as a script writer and storyliner for much of the show's run.

A building at 83 Moncur Street, Woollahra, was used for exterior establishing shots of the block of flats. The majority of taping was done on sets at Channel Ten's studio based then in North Ryde, Sydney.

Directors included Peter Benardos and Brian Phillis. Regular writers included David Sale, Johnny Whyte, who was the series final script editor, Susan Swinford, Dick Barry, Michael Laurence, Lynn Foster, Ken Shadie and Eleanor Witcombe.

Story arcs (controversial)

Number 96 became infamous for its groundbreaking adult storylines and nudity, its comedy characters, and controversial storylines including teenage drug addiction and a black mass conducted by devil worshippers. Whodunits included a panty snatcher (dubbed the Knicker Snipper), the Pantyhose Strangler, the Hooded Rapist, and a bomb that exploded killing off four characters.

A story where Rose Godolfus (Vivienne Garrett) took marijuana was the first time the Australian Broadcasting Control Board exercised the 101 censorship code, insisting that Rose must be shown to suffer from its effects.

However, a few years later, at the request of NSW Police, a heroin drug storyline was explored with 15-year-old schoolgirl Debbie Chester (Dina Mann). She was seen being taught how to inject heroin with a needle, in a storyline designed to warn parents how easy it was to do.

Early shock moments involved the travails of the pregnant Helen Eastwood (Briony Behets) whose husband Mark (Martin Harris) had an affair with Rose Godolfus. Helen caught them in bed together and miscarried, while Rose was later gang-raped by bikies. Doctor Gordon Vansard (Joe James) was struck off for providing drugs for an illegal abortion. His wife Sonia (Lynn Rainbow) suffered from mental delusions, before leaving and returning for the film version of Number 96. 
 
An early interracial kiss occurred between character Chad Farrell, played by Ronne Arnold, and Sonia (Lyn Rainbow), and this storyline was said to have made the show unable to be sold to the US, who could have cut out the nudity, but would have still had problems with an interracial kiss and homosexual themes. A later interracial romances over 20 episodes with Indigenous Australian actress Justine Saunders as hairdresser Rhonda Jackson. She had an affair with Dudley (Chard Hayward) but was secretly in love with Arnold Jeff Kevin and the actress became the first Indigenous woman to appear on the cover of TV Week while publicising this role

Cast list
Actors highlighted in yellow are original cast members.
Note: Number 96, featured more than 100 cast members, and the ensuing list is a selection only of more prominent only.
 The TV series launched the TV career of Abigail, who played the first incarnation of character Beverley Houghton and was billed as a sex symbol

Famous celebrity cameos
The series featured over 100 performers, including screenwriter and technicians. Many upcoming performers where given the opportunity in the industry to develop their performances, whilst an alumnus of the showbiz world made guest appearances 

Numerous stars wanted to appear in guest roles, even racing identity Gai Waterhouse, who unsuccessfully auditioned after completing a drama course in England. Also suggested was a young Bryan Brown (although having been in England he had acquired a British accent, and was considered unsuitable by producer Bill Harmon, even though he hailed from Parramatta).

Visit by Royalty
The Duke and Duchess of Bedford visited the set and appeared in a cameo in the series, in a storyline in which they come to visit Baroness Amanda Von Pappernburg (played by Carol Raye).

Series background

The series became famous for every episode ending in a cliffhanger and they were the first to do a summer cliffhanger, where the cliffhangers would be ramped up with every character in peril over the six week break the show took for the summer hiatis. In 1972, it was the car crash of Gordon (Joe James) and in 1973, Bev (Victoria Raymond) was shot. In 1974, Patti (Pamela Garrick) was the shock second victim of the Pantyhose Strangler, but in 1975, instead of a death, it was the mysterious resurrection of Jaja (Anya Saleky) who was thought to be dead. For its last summer cliffhanger, a drunk Herb (Ron Shand) was seen leaving Sydney on a train with a mystery blonde out to rob him.

During 1974, the series shifted its emphasis from sexual situations and drama to focus more on comedy. After the introduction of colour TV in 1975, ratings went into decline as its audience began switching over to bigger budget American shows (that year the show was only the third highest-rated show of the year, behind The Six Million Dollar Man and repeats of Bewitched. A bold new storyline was devised to revitalise the series and in an unprecedented move, 40 complete scripts were discarded and rewritten. The Number 96 set was sealed off to non-essential personnel with a new storyline involving a mysterious figure planting bombs, with several false alarms. The dramatic storyline was intended to draw back viewers and to provide a mechanism to quickly write out several existing characters in a bid to freshen up the cast of characters and revamp the storylines.

On Friday 5 September 1975, a planted bomb exploded in the delicatessen, destroying it and the adjacent wine bar, which was crowded with customers. The sequence was filmed on a Saturday because the studio was empty, and real gelignite was used, resulting in the studio doors being blown off their hinges.

The makers of the show made a bold move, killing off several long-running cast favourite's which were revealed on the front page of newspapers on Monday 8 September 1975. They included Les (Gordon McDougall), Aldo and Roma Godolfus (Johnny Lockwood and Philippa Baker), and then revealing scheming Maggie Cameron (Bettina Welch) as the bomber and sending her off to prison. Maggie never planned for the bomb to kill anyone and merely wanted to scare residents into moving to facilitate a sale of the building. Despite the publicity and major changes it brought, the bomb-blast storyline resulted in only a temporary boost to the program's ratings, but it provided material for future storyline's, particularly with the trial of Maggie Cameron.

By October central figures Lucy and Alf Sutcliffe (played by original cast members Elisabeth Kirkby and James Elliott) were also written out of the series. New younger characters were added to the show, most of whom didn't last out the series. Two that did were teenage sisters Debbie and Jane Chester Dina Mann and Suzanne Church, and they became orphans when their parents were taken by a shark in an obvious nod to a certain shark film Jaws. Other enduring characters among the high cast turnover of the later period were the new blond sex-symbol Jaja Gibson (Anya Saleky), and Giovanni Lenzi (Harry Michaels), an exuberant Italian who worked in the deli.

Another whodunnit storyline was the Hooded Rapist in May 1976. There was an increase in location shooting, including Moncur Street, Woollahra (outside the building used in the credits), local parks, Chinatown, and Luna Park.

The final year of Number 96 featured a continued emphasis on younger characters, the reintroduction of sexual situations and more and more extreme nudity, and increasingly violent situations. Carol Raye, who had left the show as Amanda but stayed on behind the scenes to do its casting, left the show at this point, and without her eye for talent, the quality of actors began to decline. Creator David Sale also quit the show in its final months, concerned that the quality of the show had dipped while he had been overseas.

Don and Dudley had split; Don's new boyfriend was Rob Forsyth (John McTernan) and then corrupt cult leader Joshua (Shane Porteous). The show's final months in 1977 also saw Dudley being machine-gunned to death before a siege in the Wine Bar (now a disco called Duddles), as well as a Nazi biker gang and a mystery blackmailer who turned out to be a character with schizophrenia.

Another bold move in the show's final months saw Number 96 embark upon on more explicit nudity when new character Miss Hemingway (Deborah Gray) arrived in April 1977. Number 96 had in November 1976 shown a brief full frontal nude flash when a nurse fled a burning bedroom, but Miss Hemingway's extensive topless and full frontal nudity sequences, over several episodes, attracted few complaints, even though it screened on free to air TV at 8.30 pm. Other bedroom farce comedy sequences featured increasing levels of male and female nudity. A scene where Jane Chester becomes a prostitute and is asked to whip her male client, new Number 96 resident Toby Buxton (Malcolm Thompson), featured a brief glimpse of his full frontal male nudity.

These changes to the series were made to combat falling viewing figures. However, they were not a success, and in July 1977 the series was cancelled due to declining ratings. Dorrie (Pat McDonald) and Herb Evans (Ron Shand) and Don Finlayson (Joe Hasham) where the only original cast members to remain to the final episode.

Series format

The first episode began with an exterior shot of the building with moving vans being unloaded while Herb and Dorrie are heard having an argument. Each subsequent episode began with an exterior shot of the building while audio from the previous episode's final scene could be heard. The shot would zoom in on the apartment in which that scene occurred, or remain unchanged, as the show's title was displayed. The vision would then switch to the scene in question as a recap of the previous episode's cliffhanger.

The feature film had a disturbing pre-credits sequence showing Vera being gang-raped, followed by the film's opening titles. After this, the opening shot is a zoom-in on the exterior of flat 3 and the action starts with the interior activities of flat 3. When asked why he chose to start the movie like this, (David Sale) quipped "I wanted people to know they were in the right cinema."

The series was broadcast as five half-hour episodes each week for its first four years. From the beginning of 1976 episodes were broadcast as two one-hour episodes each week in most areas. However, from an internal perspective episodes continued to be written and compiled in half-hour instalments.

Film adaptation
 
Number 96 was adapted as a feature film in 1974 and titled Number 96. One of its major drawcards was it was a full-colour production, unlike the series, which was still broadcasting in monochrome. It had the same creative team and mostly the same cast as the series. Although it received mostly negative reviews, audiences lined up all down George Street to gain a seat on its opening day. It earned nearly A$2.8 million on a A$100,000 budget, and was the most profitable Australian movies ever made at that time. It was also the 5th highest grossing Australian movie of the 1970s. Each character in the film would receive applause when they made their first entrance.

Final night
 
The final episode ended with a reunion curtain call of popular cast members past and present. A week after the airing of the final episode in Sydney, a televised public auction of props and costumes from the series was held in the grounds of Channel 10.

Cultural impact and reception

Number 96 was rated number 9 in the 2005 television special 50 Years 50 Shows, which counted down Australia's greatest television programs.
 
McKenzie Wark wrote in Celebrities, Culture and Cyberspace (published by Pluto Press, 1999): "Once, when I was a kid, I was walking down a suburban street at night, when I noticed a rhythmic flickering of light from inside the houses. Though screened from view by the drawn curtains, the lights from a row of separate houses were all pulsing in time, and then I heard the music and I knew everyone was watching the same show ... Number 96."
 
John Singleton wrote: "When Shakespeare was writing his plays, people queued up for Shakespeare. Today, they're queuing up for Number 96, so in my opinion Number 96 is today's Shakespeare."
 
Phillip Adams, from newspaper The Age, wrote: "I believe that television serials provide a surrogate sense of community and that many viewers are more involved in Number 96 than they are in their own community."
 
The series was featured in cinema documentary Not Quite Hollywood (2008). Interviewees included Number 96 actors Rebecca Gilling, Wendy Hughes, Lynette Curran, Briony Behets, Candy Raymond, Deborah Gray, Roger Ward, and Norman Yemm, and an associate producer of Number 96 and The Unisexers, David Hannay.

Cult status

Number 96 was the first Australian soap opera/serial to gain a significant cult following, prior to the network's internationally successful  series Prisoner. It led to huge merchandise such as tie-in books and novels, singles and LPs recorded by cast members, disco album, cookbook, T-shirts, a 1974 feature film also called Number 96, and a short-lived 1980 American remake.

When the series started. its cast was one of the largest ever assembled for a local production. When it ended after 1218 episodes, it was the longest-running soap opera produced in Australia, having surpassed the ABC series Bellbird. Number 96 was surpassed by The Young Doctors in 1982.
 
At the series' height, The New York Times stated it was the highest-rated program of its kind in the world.
 
When the stars travelled from Sydney to Melbourne via train to attend the Logie Awards ceremony, they were mobbed at stations during whistle stops. Crowds in Melbourne were greater in number than those that met The Beatles during their only Australian tour in 1964.
  
Whilst the program was extremely popular in Australia, and made for the Australian market, because of its risqué subject matter and storylines, it did not sell into any overseas markets. The show was written up in Time magazine, but it could never have screened in the United States, because of its nudity, homosexuality, and interracial romances.
 
The series was based during the era of mass emigration to Australia, and its hugely multicultural cast included characters who were Jewish Hungarian, South African, Indian, and those of British extraction, including a "whinging Pom". It included veteran actors from Australia, mainly from the early days of radio and stage. Indeed, as theatre had been the preferred form of entertainment, many stars, such as Wendy Blacklock, were reluctant to go into a TV serial, but once she got there, she remained until the final episode.

The series, although originally based on elements of Coronation Street, which screened twice a week, was later more likened to US serial Peyton Place, which at its peak had three half-hour episodes a week. Neither show could match its prestigious output of five half-hour episodes a week, all year except for a six-week break over summer.

Controversies
 
The show attracted many complaints. The Australian Broadcasting Control Board repeatedly sanctioned the network. To keep the series on air, each episode was previewed to ensure it complied with control board guidelines. Sometimes, offending scenes were cut from the episode after its Sydney airing and were not seen when episode screened elsewhere. Consequently, the first episodes feature cuts and screen blackouts. Paperwork about the offensive material, which includes most of the Black Mass, survives with the National Film and Sound Archive, but the actual reel of footage has never been found. Eventually, due to the show's popularity, the control board relaxed its restrictions and stopped previewing episodes. By the time the show was winding up in 1977, nobody seemed to be checking its output, which was far racier than anything that had been dared in its early years when it was under constant surveillance.

Awards
 
In addition to the four Logies won by cast member Pat McDonald during her run with the show, Number 96 won the "Best Drama" Logie in 1974, 1975, and 1976. Actor Bunney Brooke won the "Best Actress" Logie Award for her work as Flo in 1975.

The series cast became stars in Australia and had their own Number 96 passenger train, specially designed for cast and crew travel, which for the show's first few years they would take the train from Sydney to Melbourne for the annual TV Week Logie Awards in a silver multicarriaged train with the commissioner's carriage hooked up at the rear for VIPs. This train was specially organised by publicity director Tom Greer. The 16-hour overnight journey left from the centre of Sydney at 4:30 pm with a farewell party, complete with red carpet and jazz band in attendance; it featured whistle stops at country sidings and saw thousands of people turn out to see their favourite stars, before it arrived at Spencer Street station. These whistle stops were all beamed back by television stations and went live to air. The rail service of the time was keen to promote its overnight tourism packages, and for the journey, the train was christened as the Spirit of 96.

A humorous story, as told by Greer, was the engagement of a piano player (the outrageous John McDonald) to entertain the cast on the train on the way to Melbourne. John could only play upright pianos. The railways rang and said they could not get the upright around the passageway corners of the train so it would be impossible to get it on board. Greer demanded it be put on the train somehow even if it meant dismantling the piano and putting it back together – "key by key". In desperation, engineers arrived and took off the side of the carriage, loaded the piano on with a forklift, before replacing the carriage wall. The train used green steam locomotive number 3801, which frequently operated the Spirit of Progress train service between Sydney and Melbourne.

Merchandise
Eight paperback novelisations (1972–74) were sold under the Arkon  imprint by Angus & Robertson. Some of these were credited to "Marina Campbell", a pseudonym of Anne Harrax. An original novel, 96 (Cover title: Number 96), was published by Stag in 1976.

In 1975, the Number 96 Cookbook was released in Australia by publisher Pacific Magazines (Family Circle)]; it featured photographs and recipes from eight members of the cast.

The series celebrated 1,000 episodes in 1976 with a compilation special, Number 96: And They Said It Wouldn't Last, which reviewed the show's most famous story lines and recounted the exploits of its departed main characters. And They Said It Wouldn't Last was repeated at the start of 1977 with a new ending presented by Dina Mann. It is featured on the first DVD release, along with a new documentary that covered the show's final 200 episodes.

International screenings

Cast members were amazed to learn the show was screening in some overseas countries. Cast member Bettina Welch reported seeing it dubbed in Italy, but this was never confirmed. Despite a short late-night run in Toronto, Canada, on Citytv, the content was too explicit for US and UK television. An attempt to sell the show at Cannes TV Festival in 1975 with a topless model backfired when British newspaper Daily Mirror reported, "it got a swift 'No Entry' sign" from their broadcasters the BBC and ATV."

American version
 
In 1980, a short-lived US remake of the same name on NBC retained the comedy, but toned down the sexual elements of the series. The series was launched over three consecutive nights, from 10 to 12 December. US television and TV Guide promotions for the series used advertising hyperbole, suggesting that the series had been "banned in Australia". The nudity and racy content of the original series were not present in the remake; it probably would not have been allowed in the US due to censorship standards there, so the US version only hinted at the sexual content that had been on display in the original. The US version of Number 96 was quickly cancelled due to low ratings. The US show was finally aired in parts of Australia in 1986.

Episodes

Availability
From 4 February 1980, TEN-10 in Sydney commenced repeating the series at midnight Mondays through Thursdays, starting from episode 585, the first episode fully produced in colour. In 1994, Network Ten repeated the 1976 special And They Said It Wouldn't Last with a new introduction by Abigail.

In November 1996, Network Ten screened a re-run of Number 96: The Movie.

Though the complete run of colour episodes (585–1218) survive, the National Film and Sound Archive retains only 19 of the first 584 black-and-white episodes. The rest were lost when the show switched to colour, with the master tapes wiped by the network for re-use, or made into a "foyer display". The first three weeks (episodes 1–15), episodes 31–35 and two episodes from the 1974 black and white episodes (episodes 450 and 534) survive. With the exception of episodes 11, 12, 14, 15 and 534, all available black-and-white episodes have been released on DVD, along with Number 96: The Movie and the 1974 and 1975 episodes 649–712, 832–847. As of March 2022, 96 of 1218 episodes have been released in some form, with 560 episodes presumed lost.

Home media
Number 96: The Movie was released in a 2-disc collectors edition on Region 4 on DVD by Umbrella Entertainment, who subsequently released three volumes of episodes across 4 discs each. Number 96: The Movie was also included the compilation Ozploitation: Volume 4 with five other Australian exploitation films.

See also 
 List of Australian television series
 The Box

References

External links 
 Aussie Soap Archive: Number 96
 Number 96 Home Page
 DVD boxed set announcement
 The History of Australian Television – Number 96
 
 
 Number 96 at the National Film and Sound Archive
Number 96 at Australian Screen Online

1970s Australian television series
1972 Australian television series debuts
1977 Australian television series endings
1980 American television series endings
1981 American television series endings
Australian television soap operas
Black-and-white Australian television shows
English-language television shows
Gay-related television shows
Network 10 original programming
NBC original programming
Television controversies in Australia
Television series by Cash Harmon Television
Television series by CBS Studios
Television shows set in Sydney
LGBT-related controversies in television